The Shenyang International Finance Center is a late-modernist supertall skyscraper proposed for construction in Shenyang, China. The office tower is set to rise  and contain 89 floors, plus three basement levels. Construction of the -glass and steel building was expected to be complete in 2012.

References

Skyscrapers in Shenyang
Skyscraper office buildings in China